Hernán Cortez (born 28 December 1961) is a Bolivian weightlifter. He competed in the men's middle heavyweight event at the 1988 Summer Olympics.

References

1961 births
Living people
Bolivian male weightlifters
Olympic weightlifters of Bolivia
Weightlifters at the 1988 Summer Olympics
Place of birth missing (living people)